The Telesterion ("Initiation Hall" from Gr. τελείω, "to complete, to fulfill, to consecrate, to initiate") was a great hall and sanctuary in Eleusis, one of the primary centers of the Eleusinian Mysteries. The hall had a fifty-five yard square roof that could cover three-thousand people, but no one revealed what happened during these events beyond there being "something done, something said, and something shown". This building was built in the 7th century BCE and was an important site until it was destroyed in the 4th century CE. Devoted to Demeter and Persephone, these initiation ceremonies were the most sacred and ancient of all the religious rites celebrated in Greece.

History 
It is disputed when the site of the Telesterion is believed to have been originally built, there is evidence to suggest that the temple was created in the 7th century BCE, historians know however that it was created at least by the time of the Homeric Hymn to Demeter (650–550 BCE). The Telesterion had ten different building phases that took place over the course of its creation.

It was destroyed by the Persians after the Battle of Thermopylae, when the Athenians withdrew to Salamis in 480 BCE and all of Boeotia and Attica fell to the Persian army, who captured and burnt Athens. After the defeat of the Persians, the Telesterion was intended to be reconstructed by Kimon, but it was instead rebuilt some time later due to Pericles' influence.

At some point in the 5th century BCE, Iktinos, the great architect of the Parthenon, built the Telesterion big enough to hold thousands of people. In about 318 BCE, Philon added a portico with twelve Doric columns.

The Telesterion continued to see use throughout the Roman period. In 170 CE, during the rule of Roman emperor Marcus Aurelius, an ancient tribe called the Costoboci launched an invasion of Roman territory south of the Danube, entering Thracia and ravaging the provinces of Macedonia and Achaea (Greece). The Costoboci reached as far south as Eleusis, where they destroyed the Telesterion. The emperor responded by dispatching general Vehilius Gratus Iulianus to Greece with emergency reinforcements, who eventually defeated the Costoboci. Marcus Aurelius then had the Telesterion rebuilt bigger than it had been before. Then only a few hundred years later in 396 CE, the forces of Alaric the Visigoth invaded the Eastern Roman Empire and ravaged Attica, destroying the Telesterion, which was never to be rebuilt.

Religious use
The Athenians used several calendars, each for different purposes. The festival of Eleusinia was celebrated each year in Eleusis and Athens for nine days from the 15th to the 23rd of the month of Boedromion (in September or October of the Gregorian calendar); because the festival calendar had 12 lunar months, the celebrations were not strictly calibrated to a year of 365 days. During the festival, Athens was crowded with visitors.

At the climax of the ceremonies at Eleusis, the initiates entered the Telesterion where they were shown the sacred relics of Demeter and the priestesses revealed their visions of the holy night (probably a fire that represented the possibility of life after death). This was the most secretive part of the Mysteries and those who had been initiated were forbidden to ever speak of the events that took place in the Telesterion.The origin of the ritual of the Eleusinia is from the myth of Persephone being taken to Hades in the underworld, while her mother Demeter franticly searches her in the mortal world. After she learns that Zeus allowed the kidnapping to happen, she turns herself into an old women and wanders around the world until she reaches Eleusis, where she is taken in by the King's daughters. She is overcome by grief, but she is given the Queen Metanira's latest born child, Demophoon to nurse. He grows more than any other child, but his mother is afraid when he is put over a flame before he can be made fully immortal. Demeter gets angry, and tells her that since she robbed her son of immortality and angered her, the people of Eleusis must create a temple to her where they would do things to gain back her favor. Even after Demeter got her daughter back from Hades for part of the year, the Eleusinian Mysteries continued. It was said in myth that Herakles partook in the Eleusian Mysteries as part of his twelfth labor in which he captured Cerberus, and during them, he saw visions of both Persephone and Demeter.

Some temple use ceased during the persecution of pagans in the late Roman Empire, when all non-Christian sanctuaries were ordered closed by law initiated by the Christian emperors. However, it was not until the anti-pagan decree of Theodosius in around 390 CE that there was an end to all religious use of the temple.

References

External links
Tommaso Serafini, “Telestérion: contributo alla definizione di una tipologia architettonica e funzionale”, in “Annuario della Scuola Archeologica di Atene e delle Missioni Italiane in Oriente” 97, 2019, pp. 130-156.
"Rock Antiquity of Eleusis" by Valeria FOL

Eleusinian Mysteries
Temples of Demeter
Temples of Persephone
7th-century BC religious buildings and structures
Destroyed temples
Persecution of pagans in the late Roman Empire